Warren Township may refer to:

Illinois
 Warren Township, Jo Daviess County, Illinois
 Warren Township, Lake County, Illinois

Indiana
 Warren Township, Clinton County, Indiana
 Warren Township, Huntington County, Indiana
 Warren Township, Marion County, Indiana
 Warren Township, Putnam County, Indiana
 Warren Township, St. Joseph County, Indiana
 Warren Township, Warren County, Indiana

Iowa
 Warren Township, Bremer County, Iowa
 Warren Township, Keokuk County, Iowa
 Warren Township, Lucas County, Iowa
 Warren Township, Poweshiek County, Iowa
 Warren Township, Story County, Iowa
 Warren Township, Wayne County, Iowa

Michigan
 Warren Township, Macomb County, Michigan, defunct
 Warren Township, Michigan, in Midland County

Minnesota
 Warren Township, Winona County, Minnesota

Missouri
 Warren Township, Camden County, Missouri
 Warren Township, Marion County, Missouri

New Jersey
 Warren Township, New Jersey

North Dakota
 Warren Township, Cass County, North Dakota, in Cass County, North Dakota

Ohio
 Warren Township, Belmont County, Ohio
 Warren Township, Jefferson County, Ohio
 Warren Township, Trumbull County, Ohio
 Warren Township, Tuscarawas County, Ohio
 Warren Township, Washington County, Ohio

Pennsylvania
 Warren Township, Bradford County, Pennsylvania
 Warren Township, Franklin County, Pennsylvania

South Dakota
 Warren Township, Clark County, South Dakota, in Clark County, South Dakota
 Warren Township, Sanborn County, South Dakota, in Sanborn County, South Dakota

Utah
 Warren Township, Weber County, Utah, in Weber County, Utah

See also
Warren (disambiguation)

Township name disambiguation pages